Annie Treffers (born  1900s) was a Dutch competitive swimmer, diver and water polo player. She was a swimmer in the earliest era of women's competitive swimming during the early 20th-century. She was a member of swimming club "Rotterdamsche Dames Zwemclub" (RDZ) in Rotterdam and represented the Netherlands and her club internationally. At the 1922 Women's Olympiad she won the gold medal in the water polo competition and the two silver medals with the Dutch relay team.

Career
Treffers was selected to compete at the 1922 Women's Olympiad, the earliest women's international swimming championships in Monte Carlo. She was selected to compete in Water polo at the 1922 Women's Olympiad with the earliest Netherlands Women's water polo team. She also competed in the 4 x 50 metre relay and 4 x 50 metre medley relay.

Ahead of the Olympiad, preparation matches in the Netherlands were organized.

At the Olympiad she won the silver medal with the Dutch relay team in the 4 × 50 metre medley relay event, where she swam the 50 m sidestroke. She won another silver medal in the 4 × 50 metre relay event

Treffers was a midfielder of the earliest Netherlands women's national water polo team at the Olympiad. She became with the team champion after winning the decisive match against the British team. They won with 6–0.

In September 1922 she went to international swimming competitions in Mönchengladbach, where she won the diving event.

In August 1924 she won at the international competitions in Mönchengladbach a second prize in an individual swimming event and won she with RDZ the water polo match.

With the RDZ water polo team she won an international match agaist Blau-Weiss in March 1926, and in April 1926 an international water polo match in Antwerp. In May 1926 she won with RDZ at international swimming competition in Brussels the relay event.

Ahead of the international swimming and water polo meeting against Germany in August 1926, Treffers was selected to join the central trainings. This was the first the national teams of Netherlands competed against Germany. The Dutch water polo team won the competition.

References

1900s births
Dutch female divers
Dutch female swimmers
Dutch female water polo players
Year of birth missing
Year of death missing